Kenan Hreljić (born 1 December 1997) is a Bosnian professional footballer who plays as a centre-back. He most recently played for Virslīga club Liepāja.

Career

Club career
Hreljić was born in Sarajevo and grew up in the Sarajevo before he went to Hungary.

MTK Budapest 

Hreljić was promoted to the first team at the age of 19, although he never played for the first team, he was on the bench on one occasion. In the first round of the Magyar Kupa on September 14, 2016 against Oroszlányi, He sat on the bench for all 90 minutes.

Metalleghe-BSI 

In August 2017, He signed for Metalleghe-BSI and returned to his country of birth. He scored his first goal in his professional career against Bosna Visoko on October 8 in the 10th round of First League of FBiH. In the only season in Jajce, he appeared nineteen times and scored two goals.

Mladost Doboj Kakanj 

In July 2018, He signed for Premier League club Mladost Doboj Kakanj. He made his debut on July 29 against Sarajevo in a 4-0 defeat at the Koševo. In total, He appeared in 34 appearances for this club, thirty one times in the league and three times in the cup. He left the club in January 2020.

Teuta 

After excellent matches in Mladost, He moved to the Albanian club Teuta. Having entered the first ninety minutes in Albania, he made his debut against Tirana in a 2-1 defeat. He won his first trophy against Tirana by winning the cup, but did not register a single minute in the final. Only twenty-nine days after he won the cup, he also won the Supercup, recording 45 minutes in a 2-1 victory.  After eight months he left the club. After eight months he left the club.

Čapljina 

Somewhat surprisingly, he signed for Čapljina, which was playing in the second tier at the time. He did not stay long in Čapljina because he left the club after just six months.

Igman Konjic 

In February 2021, Hreljić signed for Igman Konjic. He became irreplaceable in the first eleven at the club. 
With Igman, he won another trophy by winning the league in the 2021-22 season. After excellent performances in the team from Konjic, he received many offers and left the club.

Liepāja 

He signed a one-year contract with the club from Latvia with the right to an extension. He made his debut against RFS on the away field and the result was 2-2. In the coming month he played against Gjilani in the first round of the 2022–23 UEFA Europa Conference League qualifiers. He experienced the peak of his career when he played against Young Boys in the second qualifying round. In December of the same year, he did not reach an agreement to sign a new contract, so he left the club when the current contract expired.

Honours
Teuta
Albanian Cup: 2019–20
Albanian Supercup: 2020

Igman Konjic
First League of FBiH: 2021–22

References

External links
Kenan Hreljić at Sofascore

1997 births
Living people
Footballers from Sarajevo
Association football central defenders
Bosnia and Herzegovina footballers
MTK Budapest FC players
NK Metalleghe-BSI players
FK Mladost Doboj Kakanj players
KF Teuta Durrës players
HNK Čapljina players
FK Igman Konjic players
FK Liepāja players
Premier League of Bosnia and Herzegovina players
First League of the Federation of Bosnia and Herzegovina players
Kategoria Superiore players
Bosnia and Herzegovina expatriate footballers
Expatriate footballers in Hungary
Expatriate footballers in Albania
Bosnia and Herzegovina expatriate sportspeople in Hungary
Bosnia and Herzegovina expatriate sportspeople in Albania